David Farnham Emery (born September 1, 1948) is an American politician from Maine. He served four terms as a Republican U.S. Representative from 1975 to 1983.

Early life and education
Emery grew up in Rockland before attending college at Worcester Polytechnic Institute, where he received a BS in electronics engineering in 1970. Upon graduating, he entered politics.

Political career

Maine House of Representatives
He served in the Maine House of Representatives 1970–1974 and was active in the Republican Party.

Congress
In 1974, Emery ran for the United States House of Representatives against incumbent Democrat Peter Kyros and won in an upset, one of only a handful of Republican gains in a year when Democrats gained 49 seats in the House of Representatives. He was reelected in 1976, 1978, and 1980.

He served as a member of the Merchant Marine and Fisheries Committee for all four terms; on the Science and Technology Committee in the 94th congress (1975–1977); and on the House Armed Services Committee during the 95th, 96th and 97th Congresses (1977–1983). He was a member of the House Republican leadership during the 97th Congress, serving as Chief Deputy Republican Whip under Trent Lott.

1982 Senate campaign
In 1982, he ran for the U.S. Senate against Democratic Senator George J. Mitchell, a former Federal Judge who had been appointed to succeed Democrat Edmund Muskie, whom President Jimmy Carter had appointed as U.S. Secretary of State. Emery was initially thought to be the favorite, but he ran a highly critical campaign which made a negative impression, and Mitchell won the election with 61% of the vote.

2005 campaign for governor
In 2005 he declared his candidacy for Governor of Maine in the 2006 election. He withdrew from the race upon the entrance of 2002 nominee Peter Cianchette, but following Cianchette's withdrawal, re-entered. In the Republican primary he came in last of the three candidates on the ballot, finishing behind State Senators Chandler Woodcock of Farmington and Peter Mills of Skowhegan. Woodcock, the nominee, lost to incumbent Democrat John Baldacci in the November 2006 general election. Emery was endorsed by U.S. Senator John McCain for Governor, who urged voters to vote for Emery in the primary.

Later life
Emery endorsed Mitt Romney for President in the 2012 election.

In April 2011, Emery was appointed Deputy Commissioner of Administrative and Financial Services by Governor of Maine Paul LePage. In August 2012, Emery resigned from the position with no explanation given.

In July 2016, Emery was chosen to run for a Maine State Senate seat against incumbent Democrat David Miramant of Camden. He was unsuccessful, receiving 48% of the vote to Miramant's 52%.

Emery is a member of the ReFormers Caucus of Issue One.

References

|-

|-

|-

1948 births
LePage Administration cabinet members
Living people
Republican Party members of the Maine House of Representatives
People from Rockland, Maine
Republican Party members of the United States House of Representatives from Maine
Worcester Polytechnic Institute alumni